Financial Tribune is a non-governmental newspaper in Iran opened in 2014. Its purpose is to cover a variety of political, economic, technology, and social stories. Though it covers a wide gamut of issues, the main focus of the newspaper is on commerce, in particular news/views related to promoting private enterprise in the economy.

Profile
The Financial Tribune editor-in-chief is Khosro Ghadiri, the paper's Senior editor is Amin Sabooni, formerly the editor-in-chief of Iran Daily newspaper. Pouya Jabal Ameli is the senior economic analyst of the newspaper.

Financial Tribune licence holder is "Donyay-e Eqtesad Media Group" and its owner is Alireza Bakhtiari who also runs the Donya-e-Eqtesad newspaper, Tejarat-e-Farda magazine and Eghtesad News website.

As of 2014, the Financial Tribune main headquarters are located in the central business district in Iran's capital Tehran.

The newspaper covers a host of up-and-coming sectors in Iran's economy. In recent months its technology and new business experts have covered subjects from the first EU-Iran Forum hosted in London to new online startup businesses operating in the country.

In April 2015, the newspaper became a 16-page newspaper with the edition of alternating pages between local and international automotive stories, science and technology developments, and environment-tourism articles. Being the first English-language paper in the country to do the variable format of sections.

The Tribune has been actively covering news about Iran's reengagement with the global economy following the lifting of the sanctions in January 2016, including Iran's airplane deals, banking relations, bilateral trade, auto deals, and international cooperation in oil, gas and renewable energies.

In 2016, the paper was ranked 6th in Ministry of Culture's list of top Iranian business newspapers. From among six candidates the Financial Tribune was selected by judges as the top website in the 'Economic News' category in the ninth edition of Iran Web Awards in 2017.

In 2017, Financial Tribune CEO Alireza Bakhtiari was awarded the Amin al-Zarb award in recognition of his journalistic endeavors in the private sector.

On September 23, 2018, and following the worsening condition of country's economy, the newspaper announced that it will be published in 8 pages. As the results, art and culture, people, sports, environment and world economy pages were removed from the print version.

Causes 
The newspaper has been a vocal critic of Iranian government policies in regards to handling Iran's ongoing water crisis since the development of the paper's environment section in January 2015. With titles such as "Water Management Deserves new Strategy", "Water Crisis: A New Wake-Up Call" and "Experts Review Water Crisis".

English newspapers in Iran
There are five English-language newspapers in Iran. The Financial Tribune is the only English-language newspaper on economics. The other newspapers published in English in Iran are the Tehran Times; Kayhan International, a Persian-language version of Kayhan published by the office of the Supreme Leader; Iran Daily, published by the administration's Islamic Republic News Agency; and Iran News, from Iran's Foreign Ministry.

See also

 Economy of Iran
 Foreign direct investment in Iran
 Industry of Iran
 Institute of Standards and Industrial Research of Iran
 International rankings of Iran
 Media in Iran
 Privatization in Iran
 Science and technology in Iran
 Taxation in Iran
 Tehran International Fair
 Tehran Stock Exchange

Financial Tribune news desks 
 International (global) news
 National (Iran) news 
 Iran Business & Markets news
 Iran Energy News
 Domestic Economy news
 Iran Auto news
 Iran Science & Technology news
 World (Global) Economy news
 Iran People news
 Iran Travel news
 Iran Environment news
 Iran Art and Culture news

References

2014 establishments in Iran
Multilingual news services
Newspapers published in Tehran
Publications established in 2014